The Sniper is a World War I poem by Scottish poet W D Cocker, written in 1917 about the impact a sniper has had not only on the life of the young soldier, but also on that soldier's family back home. It is not revealed which side the sniper is on, as the deed is the same, whether the victim is German or British.

This poem shows Cocker's dissatisfaction with what was becoming almost anonymous cold-blooded killing from varying distances (200 yards within the poem) - a far cry from battles before the age of industrialisation, when soldiers and warriors fought face to face, with the stronger individual emerging the victor.

The Sniper, by W.D. Cocker
Two hundred yards away he saw his head;
He raised his rifle, took quick aim and shot him.
Two hundred yards away the man dropped dead;
With bright exulting eye he turned and said,
'By Jove, I got him!'
And he was jubilant; had he not won
The meed of praise his comrades haste to pay?
He smiled; he could not see what he had done;
The dead man lay two hundred yards away.
He could not see the dead, reproachful eyes,
The youthful face which Death had not defiled
But had transfigured when he claimed his prize.
Had he seen this perhaps he had not smiled.
He could not see the woman as she wept
To the news two hundred miles away,
Or through his very dream she would have crept.
And into all his thoughts by night and day.
Two hundred yards away, and, bending o'er
A body in a trench, rough men proclaim
Sadly, that Fritz, the merry is no more.
(Or shall we call him Jack? It's all the same.)

Scottish poems
World War I poems
1917 poems